Ghyalchok is a village in Gorkha District in the Gandaki Province of northern-central Nepal. At the time of the 1991 Nepal census it had a population of 4,659 and had 848 houses in the town.

References

Populated places in Gorkha District